Grote Prijs Beeckman-De Caluwé is a single-day road bicycle race held annually in July in Ninove, Belgium. The 169 km race is named after the local cyclists Kamiel Beeckman and Edgard de Caluwé, winner of the Tour of Flanders (1938).

Winners

External links
 Official Website  
 Results GP Beeckman-De Caluwé 

Recurring sporting events established in 1943
1943 establishments in Belgium
Cycle races in Belgium